Dasht Rural District is in the Central District of Meshgin Shahr County, Ardabil province, Iran. At the census of 2006, its population was 19,750 in 4,288 households; there were 18,662 inhabitants in 5,143 households at the following census of 2011; and in the most recent census of 2016, the population of the rural district was 23,699 in 7,495 households. The largest of its 28 villages was Jabdaraq, with 2,441 people.

References 

Meshgin Shahr County

Rural Districts of Ardabil Province

Populated places in Ardabil Province

Populated places in Meshgin Shahr County